Phuttharaksa "Pat" Neegree (born 25 February 1974 in Mae Hong Son Province) is a Thai rower. She competed in the single sculls race at the 2012 Summer Olympics and placed 5th in Final C and 17th overall.

References

1974 births
Living people
Phuttharaksa Neegree
Phuttharaksa Neegree
Rowers at the 2000 Summer Olympics
Rowers at the 2004 Summer Olympics
Rowers at the 2012 Summer Olympics
Rowers at the 2016 Summer Olympics
Place of birth missing (living people)
Asian Games medalists in rowing
Rowers at the 1998 Asian Games
Rowers at the 2002 Asian Games
Rowers at the 2006 Asian Games
Rowers at the 2014 Asian Games
Rowers at the 2018 Asian Games
Phuttharaksa Neegree
Phuttharaksa Neegree
Phuttharaksa Neegree
Medalists at the 1998 Asian Games
Medalists at the 2002 Asian Games
Medalists at the 2006 Asian Games
Medalists at the 2014 Asian Games
Medalists at the 2018 Asian Games
Phuttharaksa Neegree
Phuttharaksa Neegree
Southeast Asian Games medalists in rowing
Competitors at the 2005 Southeast Asian Games
Phuttharaksa Neegree
Phuttharaksa Neegree